Supernatural is the eighteenth studio album by American rock band Santana, released on June 15, 1999, on Arista Records. After Santana found themselves without a label in the mid-1990s, founding member and guitarist Carlos Santana began talks with Arista president Clive Davis, who had originally signed the group to Columbia Records in 1969. Santana and Davis worked with A&R man Pete Ganbarg, as Santana wanted to focus on pop and radio-friendly material. The album features collaborations with several contemporary guest artists, including Rob Thomas, Eric Clapton, Eagle-Eye Cherry, Lauryn Hill, Dave Matthews, Maná, and CeeLo Green.

Supernatural was a huge commercial success worldwide, generating renewed interest in Santana's music. It reached No. 1 in eleven countries, including the US for 12 non-consecutive weeks, where it is certified 15× platinum. The first of six singles from the album, "Smooth" featuring Matchbox Twenty singer Rob Thomas, and co-written by Thomas and Itaal Shur, was a number one success worldwide and topped the Billboard Hot 100 chart for 12 weeks. The next, "Maria Maria", featuring the Product G&B, was number one in the US for 10 weeks. Supernatural is Santana’s best-selling album to date, the best-selling album by a Hispanic artist in music history, and one of the best-selling albums of all time, selling an estimated 30 million copies worldwide.

At the 2000 Grammy Awards, Supernatural won nine Grammy Awards, breaking the record held by Michael Jackson's Thriller for the most honored album. These included Album of the Year, making Carlos the first Hispanic to win it, and Best Rock Album. Santana won eight of these, tying Jackson's record for the most awards in one night. Santana also won three Latin Grammy Awards including Record of the Year.

Background
After Santana's record deal with Columbia Records came to an end in 1991, the band's two subsequent albums for Polydor/Island, Milagro (1992) and Sacred Fire: Live in South America (1993), failed to attract strong sales and chart positions. Founder member and guitarist Carlos Santana felt the label were not giving the band any "traction and acceleration". In October 1996, he met Island founder Chris Blackwell in New York City where he asked for his release. Santana told Blackwell that he had "a masterpiece" album in him, but felt Island was not the right label for such plans. Blackwell subsequently travelled to Santana's home in Sausalito, California in an attempt to change the guitarist's mind, but Santana persisted and he was released from the label without paying compensation for the early termination.

Santana, along with band manager Greg DiGiovine and attorney John Branca, approached several labels, but they struggled to find one suitable and the guitarist recalled that some considered him too old. In 1995, he was invited to participate in a documentary about Arista founder Clive Davis, who first signed the band to Columbia in 1969. Santana, with encouragement from his wife, approached Davis about the possibility of signing with Arista. Eventually Santana, DiGiovine and Branca scored interest from three labels: Arista, EMI, and Tommy Boy; the three were most interested in EMI, however, as they were willing to pay as much as four times as much money than the others. In early 1997, Santana entered the studio to start on Supernatural while the contract was being finalized, but he soon had second thoughts as he recognised Davis' ability to generate hit records. After the contract was scrapped in May 1997, Santana reconnected with Davis and later said he "Didn't rub it in my face. He said the company was still interested." However, Davis needed to see if the band were still a commercially viable attraction, so Santana invited him to attend the band's upcoming concert at Radio City Music Hall in July, which featured a new line-up of the group. Davis was impressed, and offered to sign the band.

Davis agreed to sign Santana on the condition that he have some creative input. This did not bother the guitarist, as he felt "safe" with Davis and knew he would not be told to play anything "crass." Santana complied and expressed his desire to produce more radio-friendly songs with strong melodies and lyrics that appealed to a broad audience. He convinced Davis that he "wasn't stuck in the '60s; I was adaptable to these times", and cited Miles Davis and John Coltrane as artists who had successful changes in musical direction towards pop in their later careers. Davis wanted Supernatural to surpass the sales of the band's best selling album, Abraxas (1970), their second, by which time had sold over 4 million copies in the US. Davis wanted half the album to be "vintage Santana" in the style of their early hit song "Oye Como Va", and the other to be "the most natural" collaborations of "contemporary influences that Carlos was very much feeling." He found the task of contacting potential artists to collaborate with him particularly exciting. Santana maintained that Supernatural was never meant to be "star-studded" at first, "but the songs really dictated different singers and different musicians." The album was initially titled Mumbo Jumbo, but it was changed shortly before its release. Davis threw a release party for the album at the Boathouse restaurant in New York City on June 1, 1999.

Songs
"The Calling" features guitarist Eric Clapton, who had attended the 1999 Grammy Awards ceremony which featured Santana performing with Lauryn Hill and asked Santana to call him if there was room for him on a future Santana track.

"Love of My Life" is a reworking of the third movement of Brahms’ Symphony No.3 in F major, which Carlos Santana called a "glorious piece of music".

Critical reception

Stephen Thomas Erlewine of AllMusic noted that "there doesn't seem to be a track that doesn't have a guest star, which brings up the primary problem with the album [...] it never develops a consistent voice that holds the album together." He added that the album is "directionless" but concluded by saying "the peak moments of Supernatural are some of Santana's best music of the '90s, which does make it a successful comeback." Rolling Stone writer David Wild also noted the number of featured artists on the album. He goes on to say "Not everything is quite so appealing", mentioning the song, "Do You Like the Way" featuring Lauryn Hill and Cee Lo Green, saying that it "seems a bit more forced."

Commercial performance
The album is one of the best-selling albums in the world, and has sold over 30 million copies worldwide,  with 11.8 million copies sold in the United States alone. It is the best-selling album by a Hispanic artist, peaking at number one in many countries.

According to the Guinness World Records in 2005, it was the band's first album to peak at number one on the Billboard 200 since Santana III in 1971, making it the longest gap between two number one albums, 28 years in total.

Arista had planned for an initial shipment of 125,000 copies, but the high level of interest in the album through word of mouth caused this to rise to 210,000. By the first week of June 1999, after the label issued a sample album to promoters, this number rose to 350,000. The album debuted at number 19 on the US Billboard 200 and eventually peaked at number one in October 1999, selling 169,000 copies that week, it would increase its sales even more in the following weeks, selling 183,000 and 199,000 on its first three weeks atop. Its highest sale came in year's final week when it sold 527,000 copies. Its sales would still stay in stratosphere after the Holiday season, selling 583,000 copies after winning nine Grammy Awards in a night, it barely dropped in sales, selling again another monstrous 441,000 copies. Its last of 12 non-consecutive weeks at number one would still see huge sales, 307,000 copies that week, it later was replaced by NSYNC No Strings Attached after selling 2.4 million copies in a week. It also debuted and peaked at number one on the Billboard Top Latin Albums chart. However, it was removed from the chart the following week after Billboard determined that the album did not meet the linguistic requirement of having at least 50% of its tracks recorded in Spanish. It was ranked on Billboard's top 200 albums of the decade as the ninth best-selling album of the 2000s.

In Australia, the album debuted at number 48 and would peak at number one on March 6, 2000. In the UK, the album peaked at number one for two weeks starting on April 1, 2000.

Singles
Copies of the first single, "Smooth", had been leaked prior to the intended June 15 radio release date and were picked up by some radio stations which began to air the song in late May. "Smooth" featured Rob Thomas on vocals, and peaked at No. 1 on the US Billboard Hot 100 for 12 weeks while it went to No. 3 in the UK and No. 4 in Australia. The next two singles were "Put Your Lights On" and "Maria Maria"; the former song was serviced to rock radio on August 24, 1999, while the latter was added to urban radio on September 14, 1999. "Maria Maria" peaked at No. 1 on the US Billboard Hot 100 for 10 weeks, No. 6 in the UK and No. 49 in Australia while "Put Your Lights On" peaked at No. 18 on the US Bubbling Under Hot 100 Singles chart, No. 97 in the UK, and was a minor hit in Australia at No. 32. The fourth single, "Corazón Espinado" featuring Maná, was released on May 30, 2000, was a top-10 hit in Spain. On August 7, 2000, "Love of My Life" was serviced to US hot and modern adult contemporary radio.

Track listing

Standard edition

Mastered by Ted Jensen

Notes
The total length of track 13 is actually 12:27. "The Calling" ends at 7:48. Hidden track "Day of Celebration" starts at 8:00 and has a length 4:27. The track listing and timing are the same on the 2010 "Legacy Edition". However, separate musician and production credits are listed for "Day of Celebration" in the liner notes, unlike the standard edition.
 (*) Asterisk notes co-producer.

Legacy Edition disc two
A "Legacy Edition" of Supernatural was released on February 16, 2010, with a new Santana-supervised remastering.

Personnel

"(Da Le) Yaleo"
Carlos Santana – guitar, vocals
Chester D. Thompson – keyboards
Benny Rietveld – bass
Billy Johnson – drums
Karl Perazzo – percussion, vocals
Raul Rekow – congas
Tony Lindsay – vocals
Jose Abel Figueroa – trombone
Mic Gillette – trombone, trumpet
Marvin McFadden  – trumpet

"Love of My Life"
This song's main melody is derived from Brahms' symphony No. 3 in F Major Op 90 Movement #3.
Dave Matthews – lead vocal
George Whitty – keyboards
Benny Rietveld – bass
Carter Beauford – drums
Karl Perazzo – congas and percussion

"Put Your Lights On"
Carlos Santana – lead guitar, congas and percussion
Everlast – rhythm guitar and lead vocal
Chester D. Thompson – keyboards
Dante Ross, John Gamble – programming
Benny Rietveld – bass

"Africa Bamba"
Carlos Santana – guitar, lead vocals, background vocals
Chester D. Thompson – keyboards
Benny Rietveld – bass
Horacio Hernandez – drums
Raul Rekow – congas
Karl Perazzo – vamp out vocals, background vocals, percussion
Tony Lindsay – background vocals

"Smooth"
Carlos Santana – lead guitar
Rob Thomas – lead vocals
Chester D. Thompson – keyboards
Benny Rietveld – bass
Rodney Holmes – drums
Karl Perazzo – percussion
Raul Rekow – congas
Jeff Cressman – trombone
Jose Abel Figueroa – trombone
Julius Melendez – trumpet
William Ortiz – trumpet

"Do You Like the Way"
Carlos Santana – lead guitar
Lauryn Hill – lead and background vocals
Cee-Lo Green – lead vocals
Francis Dunnery, Al Anderson – rhythm guitar
Loris Holland – keyboards
Kobie Brown, Che Pope – programming
Tom Barney – bass
Lenesha Randolph – background vocals
Danny Wolinski – saxophone and flute
Steve Touré – trombone
Earl Gardner – trumpet and flugelhorn
Joseph Daley – tuba

"Maria Maria"
Carlos Santana – guitar, background vocals 
The Product G&B – lead vocals
Joseph Herbert – cello
Daniel Seidenberg – viola
Hari Balakrisnan – viola
Jeremy Cohen – violin

"Migra"
Carlos Santana – guitar and sleigh bells
Chester D. Thompson – keyboards
K.C. Porter – programming, accordion and vocals
Benny Rietveld – bass
Rodney Holmes – drums
Karl Perazzo – percussion and vocals
Raul Rekow – congas
Tony Lindsay  – vocals
Ramon Flores – trombone
Mic Gillette – trombone, trumpet
Jose Abel Figueroa – trumpet
Marvin McFadden – trumpet

"Corazón Espinado"
Carlos Santana – lead guitar
Fher Olvera – lead vocals
Sergio Vallín – rhythm guitar
Alberto Salas – keyboards
Chester D. Thompson – keyboards
Juan Calleros – bass
Alex González – drums and background vocals
Karl Perazzo – timbales and percussion
Raul Rekow – congas
Gonzalo Chomat – background vocals
Jose Quintana – vocal direction

"Wishing It Was"
Carlos Santana – lead and rhythm guitar
Eagle-Eye Cherry – lead vocal
Chad & Earl – background vocals
Chester D. Thompson – keyboards
Benny Rietveld – bass
Rodney Holmes – drums
Karl Perazzo – timbales and percussion
Raul Rekow – congas and percussion
Humberto Hernandez – additional percussion

"El Farol"
Carlos Santana – lead guitar
Raul Pacheco – rhythm guitar and percussion
K.C. Porter – keyboards and programming
Chester D. Thompson – keyboards and programming
Benny Rietveld – bass
Gregg Bissonette – drums
Karl Perazzo – timbales
Raul Rekow – congas

"Primavera"
Carlos Santana – lead guitar, background vocals
J. B. Eckl – rhythm guitar
K.C. Porter – lead vocals, keyboards, programming, background vocals
Chester D. Thompson – keyboards
Mike Porcaro – bass
Jimmy Keegan – drums
Karl Perazzo – timbales and percussion, background vocals
Luis Conte – congas and percussion
Fher – background vocals
Tony Lindsay – background vocals
Chein Garcia Alonso – Spanish translation

"The Calling"
Eric Clapton – lead and rhythm guitar
Carlos Santana – lead and rhythm guitar, percussions 
Chester D. Thompson – keyboards
Mike Mani – programming
Tony Lindsay – vocals
Jeanie Tracy – vocals
Andre for Screaming Lizard – Pro Tools editing

Charts

Weekly charts

Year-end charts

Certifications and sales

Release history

See also
List of best-selling albums
List of best-selling albums in the United States
List of Billboard 200 number-one albums of 1999
List of UK Albums Chart number ones of the 2000s

References

1999 albums
Concept albums
Santana (band) albums
Arista Records albums
Albums produced by Dante Ross
Albums produced by Clive Davis
Albums produced by Wyclef Jean
Albums produced by K. C. Porter
Grammy Award for Best Rock Album
Grammy Award for Album of the Year
Albums produced by Jerry Duplessis
Albums produced by the Dust Brothers
Albums recorded at Electric Lady Studios